Monte Lewis (born October 14, 1988) is an American football defensive lineman who is currently a free agent. He played college football at Jacksonville State University and attended Abbeville High School in Abbeville, Alabama. He has also been a member of the Washington Redskins, Hamilton Tiger-Cats, Ottawa Redblacks, San Jose SaberCats, Orlando Predators
and Tampa Bay Storm.

Early life
Lewis attended Abbeville High School in Abbeville, Alabama.

College career
Lewis played for the Jacksonville State Gamecocks from 2007 to 2011. He was the team's starter his final two and a half years and helped the Gamecocks to 32 wins. He played in 45 games during his career including 28 starts at defensive end. Lewis was named First-team All-Ohio Valley Conference as a junior and Second-team All-OVC as a senior.

Professional career

Washington Redskins
On April 29, 2012, Lewis signed as an undrafted free agent with the Washington Redskins. On August 27, 2012, Lewis was waived by the Redskins.

Hamilton Tiger-Cats
In October 2012, Lewis was signed to the Hamilton Tiger-Cats practice roster. On April 16, 2013, Lewis re-signed with the Tiger-Cats.

San Jose SaberCats
Lewis was assigned to the San Jose SaberCats in 2013. On September 24, 2014, Lewis was activated from other league exempt by the SaberCats. On March 23, 2015, Lewis was placed on recallable reassignment.

Ottawa Redblacks
On March 4, 2014, Lewis signed with the Ottawa Redblacks in 2014. On August 7, 2014, Lewis was activated by the Redblacks. On June 21, 2014, Lewis was released by the Redblacks.

Orlando Predators
Lewis was assigned to the Orlando Predators in 2015. Lewis returned to the Predators in 2016.

Tampa Bay Storm
Lewis was assigned to the Tampa Bay Storm on October 24, 2016, during the dispersal draft. The Storm picked up Lewis' rookie option on January 5, 2017. The Storm folded in December 2017.

Wuhan Gators
Lewis was selected by the Wuhan Gators in the fifth round of the 2017 CAFL Draft.

Baltimore Brigade
On March 20, 2018, Lewis was assigned to the Baltimore Brigade.

Atlantic City Blackjacks
On March 29, 2019, Lewis was assigned to the Atlantic City Blackjacks.

References

External links
Jacksonville State Gamecocks profile

Living people
1988 births
American football defensive linemen
Canadian football defensive linemen
American players of Canadian football
Jacksonville State Gamecocks football players
Hamilton Tiger-Cats players
Ottawa Redblacks players
San Jose SaberCats players
Orlando Predators players
Tampa Bay Storm players
Washington Redskins players
Wuhan Gators players
Baltimore Brigade players
Atlantic City Blackjacks players
Players of American football from Alabama
People from Abbeville, Alabama